Former Thrift Mill is a historic textile mill complex and national historic district located near Charlotte, Mecklenburg County, North Carolina. The complex was built about 1912 and consists of three principal production and warehouse buildings: the Main Building; the Weave Department; and the Warehouse.  Other contributing resources are the Storage Structure (c. 1912); the Reservoir (c. 1912); Water Tower No. 1 (c. 1925); Water Tower No. 2 (c. 1925); and Pump House No. 1 (c. 1925).

It was added to the National Register of Historic Places in 1994.

References

Textile mills in North Carolina
Industrial buildings and structures on the National Register of Historic Places in North Carolina
Historic districts on the National Register of Historic Places in North Carolina
Industrial buildings completed in 1904
Buildings and structures in Charlotte, North Carolina
National Register of Historic Places in Mecklenburg County, North Carolina